Philbin Inlet is a narrow, ice-filled inlet about 15 nautical miles (28 km) long that indents the north end of Martin Peninsula between Murray Foreland and Slichter Foreland, on Walgreen Coast, Marie Byrd Land. First mapped by United States Geological Survey (USGS) from air photos taken by U.S. Navy Operation Highjump in January 1947. Named by Advisory Committee on Antarctic Names (US-ACAN) after Brigadier General Tobias "Toby" Philbin, USA, who served the Secretary of Defense in liaison with the U.S. Navy during the 1957-58 IGY.

Inlets of Antarctica
Bodies of water of Marie Byrd Land